Interstate 86 (I-86) is an Interstate Highway that extends for  through northwestern Pennsylvania and the Southern Tier region of New York, in the United States. The highway has two segments: the longer of the two begins at an interchange with I-90 east of Erie, Pennsylvania, and ends just beyond the Chemung-Tioga county line at the Pennsylvania border, while the second extends from I-81 east of Binghamton to New York State Route 79 (NY 79) in Windsor. When projects to upgrade the existing NY 17 to Interstate Highway standards are completed, I-86 will extend from I-90 near Erie to the New York State Thruway (I-87) in Woodbury. The portion in Erie County, Pennsylvania, is known as the Hopkins-Bowser Highway and is signed as such at each end. In New York, the current and future alignment of I-86 is known as the Southern Tier Expressway west of I-81 in Binghamton and the Quickway east of I-81.

Except for a section of about  that dips into Pennsylvania at exit 60 near the New York village of Waverly and the Pennsylvania borough of South Waverly, the rest of I-86 will be in New York. The section of NY 17 through South Waverly is maintained by the New York State Department of Transportation (NYSDOT), however. The Southern Tier Expressway section of I-86 and NY 17 comprises Corridor T of the Appalachian Development Highway System. I-86 connects to US Route 219 (US 219) in Salamanca, Seneca Nation; I-390 near Avoca and I-99/US 15 just west of Corning.

Most of the Quickway and the Southern Tier Expressway was built in stages from the 1950s to the 1980s. The I-86 designation was assigned on December 3, 1999, to the entirety of since-decommissioned Pennsylvania Route 17 (PA 17) and to the westernmost  of NY 17. It has been extended eastward as more sections of the existing NY 17 freeway have been upgraded to Interstate Highway standards, first to NY 14 in Horseheads in 2004, to NY 352 in Elmira in 2008, and its current terminus at the Chemung–Tioga county line in 2013. The segment of NY 17 between I-81 and NY 79 was designated as part of I-86 in 2006, but this segment currently remains discontinuous with the rest of I-86 while work is being done in the Binghamton area to bring NY 17 up to Interstate standards.

Route description

|-
|PA
|
|-
|NY
|
|-
|Total
|
|}

Pennsylvania to Olean

I-86 begins at an interchange with I-90 in a relatively flat area of northwestern Pennsylvania. It heads to the southeast, meeting PA 89 at exit 3 before curving to the east and crossing into New York, where it becomes concurrent with NY 17. The freeway heads generally east–west across southwest Chautauqua County, serving the hamlet of Findley Lake and the village of Sherman via NY 426 and NY 76, respectively, as it proceeds toward Chautauqua Lake.

After crossing Chautauqua Lake, I-86 merges into an older section of freeway at exit 10 near Bemus Point; this freeway is now NY 954J northwest of the newer extension. NY 954J runs into NY 430, which (along with NY 394) carried NY 17 to Westfield before the 1980s extension. From Bemus Point to Jamestown (exit 12), I-86 parallels the old NY 17 (now NY 430) along the northeast shore of Chautauqua Lake. The Erie Railroad extension to Chicago (built as the Atlantic and Great Western Railroad) comes into Jamestown from the southwest and parallels I-86 to its junction with the Erie's original main line to Dunkirk at Salamanca.

From Jamestown to Salamanca, the old NY 17 (now mostly NY 394), the new I-86 and the railroad run generally parallel through river valleys. The transportation routes run along the Chadakoin River, Conewango Creek and Little Conewango Creek to Steamburg (exit 17), cutting east to the Allegheny River at Coldspring there. The valley of the Allegheny takes the routes to Salamanca (exit 20), where the railroads merged, and beyond to Olean (exits 25 and 26). From Salamanca to Olean, the old NY 17 is now NY 417. At Olean, the Allegheny River and NY 417 (old NY 17) continue southeast, while I-86 and the Erie Railroad head northeast. NY 417 does not return to I-86 until exit 44 near Painted Post, and the Erie switches between the two alignments several times.

Olean to Elmira
I-86 and the old Erie line (now part of the Western New York and Pennsylvania Railroad) run northeast along the valleys of Olean Creek and Oil Creek to Cuba (exit 28). From Cuba to Friendship (exit 29), they run through a valley and over a summit, then following Van Campen Creek northeast to Belvidere (exit 30). At Belvidere, the Erie turns southeast to meet NY 417 at Wellsville, but I-86 continues northeast through the valleys of the Genesee River and Angelica Creek to Angelica (exit 31), and then east along Angelica Creek, over a summit that is the highest point on the Interstate, and along Karr Valley Creek to Almond (exit 33).

At Almond, I-86 rejoins the Erie Railroad, passing through Canacadea Creek valley about halfway to Hornellsville. However, where the railroad turns southeast to Hornellsville, I-86 continues northeast across a summit and into the wide Canisteo River valley (exit 34). It leaves the valley along Carrington Creek but quickly turns east across a summit to follow Big Creek and cross another summit to Howard (exit 35). I-86 runs alongside Goff Creek from Howard to the wide Cohocton River valley, where it meets the south end of I-390 (exit 36) near Avoca and turns southeast through that valley, parallel to the Erie's Rochester–Painted Post line (Buffalo, New York, and Erie Railroad).

I-86, NY 415 (old US 15) and the Erie branch all run southeast along the Cohocton River past Bath (exit 38) to Painted Post (exit 44), now the north end of I-99 and US 15. NY 417 (old NY 17) also ends at exit 44, while NY 415 continues east into Corning (exits 45–46). From Painted Post through Corning to Big Flats (exit 49), I-86, NY 352 (old NY 17) and the Erie Railroad run through the Chemung River valley. NY 352 begins at exit 45, west of downtown Corning, and is a recently bypassed four-lane road through Corning. East of East Corning (exit 48), the freeway was built as an on-the-spot upgrade of the old NY 17.

At Big Flats, the Chemung River (and NY 352) turns southeast to downtown Elmira, while I-86 and the Erie continue east-northeast alongside Singsing Creek to the vicinity of Elmira Corning Regional Airport. The highway continues into Horseheads, where it becomes an elevated highway through the use of a large arrangement of embankments and bridges. It connects to NY 14 and NY 13 via exits 52 and 54, respectively, before turning south to follow Newtown Creek into Elmira. Just east of the city's downtown district, I-86 meets NY 352 (exit 56), then continues to the Chemung–Tioga county line. The I-86 designation ends here; however, a  section of NY 17 just east of Binghamton is also designated as I-86, creating a temporary gap in the designation. The Broome County segment runs from I-81 at exit 75 in Kirkwood to NY 79 at exit 79 in Windsor.

History

Origins and the Quickway

The first long-distance route through the modern I-86 corridor was NY 17, which extended from Westfield to New Jersey via Harriman when it was assigned in 1924. Much of NY 17 followed a routing parallel or identical to that of the modern Southern Tier Expressway and Quickway; however, it followed a more northerly routing between Westfield and Bemus Point (via modern NY 394 and NY 430) and a more southerly track from Belvidere to Corning (via what is now NY 19 and NY 417). NY 17 was realigned as part of the 1930 state highway renumbering to travel directly from Olean to Wellsville on modern NY 417, located well to the south of today's Southern Tier Expressway.

By the late 1940s, the portion of NY 17 through the Catskill Mountains and Orange and Rockland counties had become prone to massive traffic jams due to both its winding and narrow composition and congestion in the villages and hamlets along the highway. As a result, the state of New York began making plans to construct an expressway leading from the New York State Thruway at Harriman to the Catskills. Construction of the NY 17 freeway began in 1947 in the Hudson Valley town of Wallkill. The first section of the new freeway, a bypass of Middletown between Fair Oaks (exit 118A, since removed) and Goshen (exit 123), opened to traffic in July 1951 as a realignment of NY 17. In 1954, several severe accidents occurred along parts of the surface NY 17, compelling the state to make constructing the freeway, dubbed the "Quickway", a higher priority.

The road was extended east first, reaching Chester (exit 127) in October 1954 and the Thruway near Harriman in August 1955. To the west, a section of the highway through Sullivan and Delaware counties was built over the right-of-way of the defunct New York, Ontario and Western Railway. Most of the Sullivan County section of the Quickway was completed during the 1950s, with the first section within the county—between Rock Hill (exit 108) and Wurtsboro (exit 114)—opening in December 1956. A second section, from Ferndale (exit 101) to north of Liberty (exit 98), was completed in July 1958. The gap between Wurtsboro and Fair Oaks in Orange County was filled on October 23, 1958, while the section between Ferndale and Rock Hill was completed in two stages. The section east of modern exit 104 in Monticello was opened in July 1959; the part north of that point opened in December 1960.

By 1969, with the assistance of federal funding from the Appalachian Regional Commission procured by New York's US Senator Robert F. Kennedy, the  route provided nonstop access between Harriman and Binghamton, and by extension New York City to Binghamton. It connected the New York State Thruway (I-87) to I-81. Despite flaws in the highway's design—it included a grade-level railroad crossing near Fair Oaks (since removed) and two stretches with intersections and driveway access—the Quickway succeeded in easing travel through southern New York, cutting the driving time in half and the accident rate by 70 percent.

Southern Tier Expressway

In February 1953, New York Governor Thomas E. Dewey proposed constructing four superhighways across the state to supplement the New York State Thruway. One of the four proposed limited-access highways would cut across the Southern Tier, linking I-90 in the west to Binghamton in the east. The first segments of what became known as the Southern Tier Expressway, a westward continuation of the Quickway, were completed in the mid-1960s. Four sections were opened to traffic at this time: Kennedy (exit 14) to Randolph (exit 16), Coldspring (exit 17) to western Salamanca (exit 20), Campbell (exit 41) to Corning (exit 45), and East Corning (exit 48) to Lowman (exit 57), parts of which were built as a surface highway. The Coldspring to Salamanca section was built out of necessity: in 1967, the first stress test of the Kinzua Dam had submerged part of the original NY 17 into the Allegheny Reservoir and made it impassable. Construction of the new highway destroyed most of the town of Red House.

A fifth section, from Owego (exit 65) to Johnson City (exit 69), opened in early 1969. The portion of the expressway between Nichols (exit 62) and Owego was opened to traffic on October 3, 1969.

Four more segments of the Southern Tier Expressway were completed over the course of the next three years. By 1972, the gaps between Randolph and Coldspring and from Johnson City to I-81 in Binghamton were filled while the expressway was extended west from Kennedy to Falconer (exit 13) and east from Lowman to Waverly (exit 60). The missing link between Waverly and Nichols was completed by 1974. The portion of the freeway in and around Waverly was originally planned to be built on the right-of-way of the Delaware, Lackawanna and Western Railroad through southern Waverly; however, the plan was scrapped in favor of a more southerly alignment that passed through the borough of South Waverly, Pennsylvania. The realignment saved $2 million (equivalent to $ in ) in construction costs and spared a handful of industries in the highway's proposed path. Both state legislatures approved the realignment in 1966 after New York agreed to maintain the section of the freeway in Pennsylvania. As part of an agreement made between the two states, Pennsylvania acquired the necessary right-of-way and easements for the freeway at the expense of New York.

Three other segments of the freeway were completed by 1974. Two of the three—from Jamestown (exit 11) and Falconer and between Almond (exit 33) and Campbell—were extensions of preexisting sections while the third, connecting Allegany (exit 24) to Hinsdale (exit 27), was isolated from the other portions of the highway. This was only temporary, however, as the freeway was completed between Hinsdale and Belvidere (exit 30) by January 1975 and opened to traffic from Belvidere to Almond on January 30, 1975. The Southern Tier Expressway was extended westward to Bemus Point by 1977, initially utilizing what is now NY 954J. In the early 1980s, work began on a westward extension to the vicinity of Erie, Pennsylvania. The Findley Lake–Bemus Point (exits 4–10) segment was completed by 1985 while the portion from I-90 east of Erie to Findley Lake was opened by 1989. From I-90 to exit 8, the freeway was initially built as a super two highway, with both directions utilizing what are now the eastbound lanes. The westbound lanes were built at a cost of $34 million (equivalent to $ in ) and opened to traffic on October 2, 1997.

Salamanca and Corning
Construction of the freeway between exits 20 and 24 was delayed for several years by members of the Seneca people, who objected to the freeway's proposed routing through the Allegany Indian Reservation. In addition, the state ceded  of land to the Seneca people— of which were taken from the adjacent Allegany State Park—and agreed to support several tax and regulatory exemptions for the Senecas. The transaction was completed in September 1981, and construction on the segment began in 1982. The portion of the expressway between exits 20 and 21 was completed by 1985.

On July 21, 1985, construction was halted by protesting Senecas who did not accept the authority of the Seneca people. The protest was organized in part by two owners of property in the path of the highway and involved the construction of an encampment on the right-of-way of the Southern Tier Expressway. The state had conducted studies on realigning the highway to bypass the disputed section; however, the Indians vacated the encampment five days later. A temporary injunction prohibiting further disruptions of the highway's construction was issued in early August, allowing work on the Salamanca–Seneca Junction (exit 23) section of the expressway to resume on August 13. This segment was completed by 1989 while the last section between Seneca Junction and Allegany was opened to traffic by 1995.

Work on the Corning Bypass, a freeway around the northern and eastern fringes of the city of Corning, began in the mid-1980s. The first segment of the highway—between NY 414 (exit 46) and East Corning—was completed by 1989 while the rest opened in the mid-1990s. The completion of the Corning Bypass, the last substantial gap in the freeway, created a continuous, mostly limited-access highway between Erie, Pennsylvania, and Harriman, New York. The completed highway, designated as PA 17 and NY 17, served as a time-saving, toll-free alternate route to the Thruway for motorists going from the New York City area to Ohio and points west. In fact, the New York State Thruway Authority initially opposed the highway's construction, fearing the loss of toll revenue on its own route from motorists shunpiking via the new highway.

Designation and conversion

The portion of the two-state freeway from I-90 near Erie to I-81 in Binghamton is designated as Corridor T of the Appalachian Development Highway System. In 1998, all of PA 17 and the portion of NY 17 from the Pennsylvania state line to Harriman were designated "High Priority Corridor 36" in the Transportation Equity Act for the 21st Century (TEA-21). New York politicians, including Senator Daniel Patrick Moynihan, and businesspeople backed the move in the hope that an efficient, high-speed roadway would inspire companies to start or expand their businesses in the state's southern counties. Shortly after the passage of TEA-21, Corridor 36 was legislatively designated as I-86 in an amendment to the bill. The American Association of State Highway and Transportation Officials (AASHTO) formally approved the designation on November 6, 1998, as "Future I-86".

On December 3, 1999, all of PA 17 and the westernmost  of NY 17 were officially designated as I-86 by the Federal Highway Administration (FHWA) following improvements to bring the roadway up to Interstate Highway standards. The designation was extended  eastward to NY 14 in Horseheads on January 28, 2004, after that section had been upgraded. On May 1, 2006, the  portion of NY 17 from I-81 in Binghamton east to NY 79 in Windsor was designated as part of I-86 following the elimination of at-grade intersections and the reconstruction of exit ramps along the stretch.

In Horseheads, a $60-million (equivalent to $ in ) project to elevate the highway and remove at-grade intersections in the village between NY 14 (exit 52) and NY 13 (exit 54) began in April 2004 and was completed on August 20, 2007. NYSDOT subsequently sought permission from the FHWA to extend I-86 over the new bypass and the existing NY 17 freeway to NY 352 in Elmira; it was granted on March 28, 2008, adding another  to the route.

A  portion of NY 17 between exits 56 and 59 originally had several at-grade intersections. Work on a project to eliminate the junctions began in January 2010. Three discontinuous sections of County Route 60 (CR 60, named Brant Road, Oneida Road, and Old NY 17), a parallel surface road, were linked together as part of the project. Two of the three at-grade junctions with CR 60—the east junction with Brant Road and the west junction with Oneida Road—were permanently closed on March 24, 2010, to allow construction to begin on the new alignment of the county route between the two locations. The $65-million (equivalent to $ in ) project was completed on November 1, 2012.

Future 

In 1998, then-Governor George Pataki signed legislation to convert the entirety of NY 17 to an Interstate and stated that the conversion would be fully completed by 2009. However, a severe lack of funding has pushed the completion date back. , the only portion west of Binghamton not officially designated as I-86 is between the Chemung–Tioga county line and the junction with I-81. The designation on this segment cannot be applied before NYSDOT completes the Prospect Mountain construction project at the junction of I-81, US 11, NY 17, and NY 7 in Binghamton, which when complete will bring the roadway up to Interstate Highway standards. The official completion of the project was set for December 2020.

Work on converting the portion of the highway east of Windsor is expected to be far more substantial than the work west of Binghamton. Currently, the only portions up to Interstate standards east of Windsor are between exit 94 (Roscoe) and exit 100 (NY 52), between exits 104 and 106 in Monticello, and between exit 116 (NY 17K) and exits 121–122 (I-84/Crystal Run Road). Aside from numerous minor interchange improvements, major work includes constructing two new interchanges in the mountainous Hale Eddy area, exits 85 and 86, to replace two at-grade intersections, as well as the relocation of driveways in that area, improving curve radiuses throughout the route, and widening the shoulders on narrow parts of the highway. Work was completed in November 2019 on a redesigned interchange at exit 131, where NY 17 meets I-87 and NY 32. Work is also underway to bring exits 124 and 125 in Goshen up to Interstate standards, which is expected to be completed in early 2020. There is no timetable for the full completion of the I-86 conversion between NY 79 in Windsor and the thruway (I-87) in Harriman. Nevertheless, segment between Bloomingburg and Goshen is signed as I-86 and NY 17.

In October 2022, Governor Kathy Hochul announced that a draft environmental impact statement on upgrading Route 17 to transform it into Interstate 86 was underway, public outreach was expected early in 2023, and that up to $1 billion was available for the work.

Exit list
Pennsylvania uses milepost-based exit numbers on its Interstate Highways; other I-86 exits are numbered sequentially.

See also

References

External links

 Interstate Guide - I-86 (Eastern)
 I-86 in New York at AARoads.com
 Pennsylvania Highways: I-86

 Pennsylvania Roads - I-86
 New York Roads - I-86

Named for former New York Senator Daniel Patrick Moynihan

 
86
86
86 east
Transportation in Erie County, Pennsylvania
Transportation in Chautauqua County, New York
Transportation in Cattaraugus County, New York
Transportation in Allegany County, New York
Transportation in Steuben County, New York
Transportation in Chemung County, New York
Transportation in Bradford County, Pennsylvania
Transportation in Broome County, New York